Svetlana Kuznetsova and Amélie Mauresmo were the defending champions but did not compete that year.

Lisa Raymond and Samantha Stosur won in the final 6–7(5–7), 6–4, 6–3 against Květa Peschke and Rennae Stubbs.

Seeds
A champion seed is indicated in bold text while text in italics indicates the round in which that seed was eliminated.

 Lisa Raymond /  Samantha Stosur (champions)
 Cara Black /  Liezel Huber (semifinals)
 Květa Peschke /  Rennae Stubbs (final)
 Alicia Molik /  Mara Santangelo (first round)

Draw

External links
 2007 Hastings Direct International Championships draw

Doubles
Hastings Direct International Championships